Yengi Qaleh or Yengeh Qaleh or Yangi Qaleh may refer to:
 Yengi Qaleh, Hamadan
 Yengi Qaleh, Markazi
 Yengi Qaleh, Bojnord, North Khorasan
 Yengeh Qaleh, Faruj, North Khorasan
 Yengi Qaleh-ye Bala, North Khorasan
 Yengi Qaleh-ye Pain, North Khorasan
 Yengi Qaleh, Qazvin
 Yengi Qaleh, Razavi Khorasan
 Yengi Qaleh, Kalat, Razavi Khorasan
 Yengeh Qaleh, Razavi Khorasan
 Yengi Qaleh-ye Kasbair, North Khorasan
 Yengi Qaleh-ye Shahrak, North Khorasan